The 1974 Pittsburgh Steelers season was the franchise's 42nd in the National Football League (NFL). They improved to a 10–3–1 regular-season record, won the AFC Central division title, sending them to the playoffs for the third consecutive season, and won a Super Bowl championship, the first league title in Steelers' history. This was the first of six consecutive AFC Central division titles for the Steelers, and the first of four Super Bowl championships in the same time period.

On March 9, 2007, NFL Network aired an episode of America's Game: The Super Bowl Champions that covered the 1974 Pittsburgh Steelers, with team commentary from Franco Harris, Joe Greene, and Andy Russell, and narrated by Ed Harris.

Offseason

NFL Draft
During the offseason, the Steelers held their training camp in St. Vincent College in Latrobe, Pennsylvania.

During the 1974 NFL Draft, the Pittsburgh Steelers would draft WR Lynn Swann in Round 1, LB Jack Lambert in Round 2, WR John Stallworth in Round 4, and C Mike Webster in Round 5, and they also signed S Donnie Shell as an undrafted free agent. All five would later be inducted into the Pro Football Hall of Fame. As of 2014, the 1974 Steelers are the only team in NFL history to select four Hall of Fame players in one single draft.

Preseason 
In the 1974 preseason, the Steelers went 6–0 and were the only undefeated team in the NFL. However, most of the talk was centered around the NFL's first successful black quarterback, Joe Gilliam. Chuck Noll started Gilliam in the preseason and after it ended, Noll started him for the first few games of the regular season. Gilliam's stellar performance in the preseason sparked a quarterback controversy in Pittsburgh.

Regular season 
Following playoff appearances in both of the two previous seasons, the Steelers appeared to be in great shape after finishing the preseason as the only undefeated team in the NFL. After the first two regular season games, the Steelers had scored a total of 65 points and were 1–0–1, but then lost to the Oakland Raiders at home. The play of the Steelers' starting quarterback at the time, Joe Gilliam, continually deteriorated. By Week 7, the Steelers were 4–1–1 and Gilliam was benched for Terry Bradshaw during a win against the Atlanta Falcons. Bradshaw won the next two games, but after a loss in Cincinnati, Noll benched Bradshaw again, this time in favor of Terry Hanratty (who had been selected in the 1969 Draft). However, Hanratty played horribly in Cleveland. The offense was struggling, but the Steelers had won those tough games behind the still-maturing Steel Curtain defense. When Bradshaw was brought back into the starting lineup, the Steelers beat the Cleveland Browns and the New Orleans Saints (in a game in which Bradshaw ran for more yards than he passed for). After a loss to Houston, the Steelers played the most important game of their regular season in New England. A win over the Patriots would clinch the AFC Central division title for the Steelers and put them in the playoffs for the third straight year. The Steelers defeated the Patriots, then beat the Cincinnati Bengals, and awaited the playoffs.

Playoffs 
In the divisional round of the playoffs, the Steelers played the Buffalo Bills. Sports Illustrateds Dan Jenkins wrote that Pittsburgh was "the only team to reach the playoffs without a quarterback". However, the Steelers dominated Buffalo and held its star running back O. J. Simpson to 49 yards rushing (it was Simpson's only playoff game appearance).

In the 1974 AFC Championship game, the Steelers played an old foe, the Oakland Raiders. Each year, their rivalry was escalating: they had met in the playoffs the previous two seasons. In 1972, the Steelers won in Pittsburgh; in 1973, the Raiders returned the favor in Oakland. In this third playoff meeting, the Steelers were ready for anything the Raiders could throw at them. Using the new "Stunt 4–3 defense" the Steelers held the Raiders to 29 yards rushing as the Steelers themselves ran for over 200 yards in Oakland. After a Franco Harris touchdown run, the Steelers clinched their first Super Bowl appearance in club history (and their first league championship game appearance).

Super Bowl IX 
The Steelers met the Minnesota Vikings in Super Bowl IX. Both teams had a hard time in the rough weather conditions at old Tulane Stadium in New Orleans. After many exchanges of punts, the Steelers finally scored a safety on a bobbled handoff by Viking quarterback Fran Tarkenton. The score at the half was 2–0. The Steel Curtain continually dominated the Vikings. Vikings coach Bud Grant tried to run at the strength of the Steel Curtain, but they were shut down. The only points Minnesota scored came from a blocked punt that the Vikings recovered in the end zone for a touchdown; the subsequent extra point attempt was blocked. After the MVP performance by running back Franco Harris (34 carries for a then-Super Bowl-record 158 yards and a touchdown), the Steelers came away with a 16–6 victory. It was the first league title in Steelers history.

Personnel

Staff

Roster

1974 schedules

Preseason schedule

Regular season schedule

Postseason schedule

Standings

Game summaries

Week 1 (Sunday, September 15, 1974): vs. Baltimore Colts 

Point spread: 
 Over/Under: 
 Time of Game: 0 hours, 0 minutes

In Week 1, the Steelers started #17 Joe Gilliam as he completed 17 of his 31 passes for 257 yards, 2 TDs, and an interception. Gilliam became the first African-American quarterback in league history to play in a game as the designated opening-day starter. The defense held Baltimore to 166 total yards and forced 4 turnovers in the shutout win.

Week 2 (Sunday, September 22, 1974): at Denver Broncos 

Point spread: 
 Over/Under: 
 Time of Game: 3 hours, 7 minutes

In Week 2, the Steelers were carried to a 35–35 OT tie with #32 Franco Harris' running game and #17 Joe Gilliam's 348 passing yards. It was the first regular season overtime game in NFL history. Denver coach John Ralston said of Gilliam that "it was possibly the finest performance I have ever seen by a quarterback."

Week 3 (Sunday, September 29, 1974): vs. Oakland Raiders

Stats

Passing

Rushing

Receiving

Kicking

Punting

Kick Return

Punt Return

Sacks

Interceptions

Fumbles

Tackles

Scoring Summary

Team

Quarter-by-quarter

Postseason summary

Divisional

AFC Championship Game (Sunday, December 29, 1974): at Oakland Raiders

Awards, honors and records
 #75 Joe Greene, National Football League Defensive Player of the Year Award
 #32 Franco Harris, Super Bowl Most Valuable Player
 Most Hall of Famers selected in one draft
 #58 Jack Lambert, NFL Defensive Rookie of the Year
 #88 Lynn Swann leader in punt return yards (577)

References

External links
 1974 Pittsburgh Steelers season at Profootballreference.com 
 1974 Pittsburgh Steelers season statistics at jt-sw.com 

Pittsburgh Steelers
AFC Central championship seasons
American Football Conference championship seasons
Pittsburgh Steelers seasons
Super Bowl champion seasons
Pittsburgh Steel